Entoloma albidum is a poisonous mushroom found in North America.

See also
List of Entoloma species

References

Poisonous fungi
Entolomataceae
Fungi described in 1917
Fungi of North America
Taxa named by William Alphonso Murrill